Brookshaw is a surname. Notable people with the surname include:

Dorothy Brookshaw, Canadian sprinter
George Brookshaw (c. 1751–1823), English painter and engraver
Richard Brookshaw (1748–c.1779), English engraver
Tracy Brookshaw, Canadian professional wrestler, better known by her ring name Traci Brooks